National Route 319 is a national highway of Japan connecting Sakaide, Kagawa and Shikokuchūō, Ehime in Japan, with a total length of 110.4 km (68.6 mi).

References

National highways in Japan
Roads in Ehime Prefecture
Roads in Kagawa Prefecture
Roads in Tokushima Prefecture